Shipai railway station is a railway station on the Guangzhou–Shenzhen railway and the Guangzhou–Shenzhen intercity railway in China.

History
A national timetable change on 10 April 2021 saw passenger service reintroduced at this station.

References

Railway stations in Guangdong